East Lynn is an unincorporated community in Butler Township, Vermilion County, Illinois, USA.

History

The town, founded in 1872, is said to have been named after the novel and play entitled East Lynne. The Methodist church was actually founded before the town, in 1869. The main trade was in grain. One man, Henry Ludden, filled several early roles in the town, as the first postmaster, the first station agent and the first to operate a store.

Demographics

References

External links
NACo

Unincorporated communities in Vermilion County, Illinois
Unincorporated communities in Illinois
Populated places established in 1872
1872 establishments in Illinois